Fonck Lake is a lake in the Andes of northern Patagonia in the Argentine  Río Negro Province. The lake is named after the German naturalist Franz Fonck. Southern river otter has been reported in the lake for the first time in 2022.

References

Nahuel Huapi
Lakes of Río Negro Province
Glacial lakes of Argentina
Nahuel Huapi National Park